Terneuzen is a city and municipality in the southwestern Netherlands, in the province of Zeeland, in the middle of Zeelandic Flanders. With almost 55,000 inhabitants, it is the most populous municipality of Zeeland.

History 

First mentioned in 1325, Terneuzen was a strategically located port on the  waterways to Ghent, in present-day Belgium.

It received city rights in 1584.

Tradition has it that Terneuzen was once the home of the legendary Flying Dutchman, Van der Decken, a captain who cursed God and was condemned to sail the seas forever, as described in the Frederick Marryat novel The Phantom Ship and the Richard Wagner opera The Flying Dutchman.

Before 1877, the city was often called Neuzen.

Geography 

The city of Terneuzen is located on the southern shore of the Western Scheldt estuary. 

The municipality of Terneuzen consists of the following population centres:

Economy 

The Ghent–Terneuzen Canal is still an important shipping route connecting the Port of Ghent. The port of Terneuzen is the third-largest in the Netherlands, after those of Rotterdam and Amsterdam. The largest plant of Dow Chemical Company outside of the United States is located at Terneuzen, on the west side of the Ghent–Terneuzen Canal.

Transport 
Terneuzen can be reached from the rest of the Netherlands via the Western Scheldt Tunnel, which opened in March 2003. Terneuzen is not linked to the rest of the Netherlands by rail, although the Dow Chemical plant is served by a freight-only line to Ghent in Belgium (Terneuzen's passenger rail service was withdrawn in 1951).

Notable residents

 Lupus Hellinck (1493 or 1494 – 1541) a Flemish composer of the Renaissance
 Sir Bernard de Gomme (1620–1685) a Dutch military engineer
 Pieter Paulus (1753–1796) a Dutch jurist, fiscal (prosecutor) of the Admiralty of the Maze and politician
 Francien de Zeeuw (1922–2015) a Dutch resistance fighter during WWII and the first female member of the Dutch armed forces
 Lodewijk van den Berg (1932–2022) astronaut on a Challenger Space Shuttle mission
 Jacques Hamelink (born 1939 in Driewegen) a Dutch poet, novelist and literary critic
 Klaas de Vries (born 1944) a Dutch composer, co-founded the Rotterdam School of music
 Eric van Damme (born 1956) a Dutch economist
 Jos de Putter (born 1959) a Dutch film director, film critic and screenwriter 
 Mark Janse (born 1959 in Sas van Gent) research professor in Asia Minor and Ancient Greek at Ghent University
 Erik de Bruyn (born 1962) film director and actor 
 Peter van Dommelen (born 1966) a Dutch archaeologist and academic
 Sandra Roelofs (born 1968) former first lady of Georgia

References

External links

 Port of Terneuzen
 Official Website (in Dutch)

 
Municipalities of Zeeland
Populated places in Zeeland
Cities in the Netherlands
Port cities and towns in the Netherlands
Port cities and towns of the North Sea
Zeelandic Flanders